CXJ may refer to:

 CXJ (airline), a defunct Chinese airline
 CXJ (airport), a Brazilian public airport